In linguistics, relational grammar (RG) is a syntactic theory which argues that primitive grammatical relations provide the ideal means to state syntactic rules in universal terms.  Relational grammar began as an alternative to transformational grammar.

Grammatical relations hierarchy 
In relational grammar, constituents that serve as the arguments to predicates are numbered in what is called the grammatical relations (GR) hierarchy. This numbering system corresponds loosely to the notions of subject, direct object and indirect object. The numbering scheme is subject → (1), direct object → (2) and indirect object → (3). Other constituents (such as oblique, genitive, and object of comparative) are called nonterms (N). The predicate is marked (P).

According to Geoffrey K. Pullum (1977), the GR hierarchy directly corresponds to the accessibility hierarchy:

A schematic representation of a clause in this formalism might look like:

Other features 
 Strata
 Chomage (see chômeur)
 Predicate valence

Universals 
One of the components of RG theory is a set of linguistic universals stated in terms of the numbered roles presented above. Such a universal is the stratal uniqueness law, which states that there can be at most one 1, 2, and 3 per stratum.

Pullum (1977) lists three more universals:
 The NP constituents of a clause are linearized in their GR hierarchy order, from left to right.
 The verb of a clause may be placed in
 (a) initial position in all clauses,
 (b) second position in all clauses, or
 (c) final position in all clauses.
 If placement of the verb leaves the subject NP noninitial, the subject may be assigned final position.

However, Pullum formulated these universals before the discovery of languages with object-initial word order. After the discovery of such languages, he retracted his prior statements.

See also
 Arc pair grammar
 Role and reference grammar

References

Sources
Johnson, David E. (1974–1979). Toward a Theory of Relationally-based Grammar. Outstanding Dissertations in Linguistics Series, ed. Jorge Hankamer.  NY: Garland Publishing, Inc.   
Johnson, David E. and Paul M. Postal (1980). Arc Pair Grammar. Princeton: PUP.  
Newmeyer, Frederick (1980). Linguistics in America. New York: Academic Press.  
Postal, Paul M.  (1974).  On Raising - An Inquiry into One Rule of English Grammar and Its Theoretical Implications. Mass.: MIT Press.

Further reading
 Blake, Barry J. (1990). Relational grammar. London: Routledge.

 Perlmutter, David M. (1980). Relational grammar. In E. A. Moravcsik & J. R. Wirth (Eds.), Syntax and semantics: Current approaches to syntax (Vol. 13, pp. 195–229). New York: Academic Press.
 Perlmutter, David M. (Ed.). (1983). Studies in relational grammar 1. Chicago: Chicago University Press.
 Perlmutter, David M.; & Rosen, Carol G. (Eds.). (1984). Studies in relational grammar 2. Chicago: Chicago University Press.
 Postal, Paul M.; & Joseph, Brian D. (Eds.). (1990). Studies in relational grammar 3. Chicago: Chicago University Press.

External links
RG SIL bibliography

Grammar frameworks